Commissioned patrol boats of the Royal New Zealand Navy from after World War II.

Class types

Lake class patrol vessel

Moa class inshore patrol boats

Lake class inshore patrol boats

Protector class offshore patrol boats

See also
 List of active Royal New Zealand Navy ships

References

 McDougall, R J  (1989) New Zealand Naval Vessels. Page 98-101. Government Printing Office. 
 Royal New Zealand Navy Official web site
 | Sale of HMNZ Ships PUKAKI and ROTOITI.
Military history of New Zealand